Stanton, Pennsylvania may refer to:

Stanton, Philadelphia
Stanton, Jefferson County, Pennsylvania
 Stanton, Pennsylvania:  the fictional city in the 2010 film Unstoppable (2010 film)
 Stanton, Pennsylvania:  the fictional city in the 2018 television series Rise

See also
New Stanton, Pennsylvania